Ili Kazakh Autonomous Prefecture (also as Yili) is an autonomous prefecture for Kazakh people in Northern Xinjiang, China, one of five autonomous prefectures in Xinjiang. Yining City is its capital. It is bordered by Mongolia, Russian Federation and Republic of Kazakhstan on the northeast to southwest, with a boundary line of 2,019 kilometers. Including Khorgas, Bakhty and Jeminay, there are 9 ports of entry at the national level. With the unique location advantage, Ili has been an important commercial hub and international channel of opening up to the west.

The autonomous prefecture covers an area of 268,591 square kilometers, accounting for 16.18% of Xinjiang. Direct-administered regions within the prefecture cover 56,622 square kilometers (21.08% of total area) and have a population of 4,930,600 (or 63.95% of registered population).

The Kazakh autonomous prefecture of Ili is a special case of administrative divisions in China, its legal status is actually an administrative division at prefecture-level. It is the only autonomous prefecture in the country that has both directly administered county-level divisions and prefectures under its jurisdiction. When the People's Republic of China was established in 1949, the 3 prefectures of Altay, Ili and Tacheng were directly under the leadership of Xinjiang provincial government. The Mongol autonomous prefecture of Bortala was founded from Bole, Jinghe and Wenquan, 3 counties of Ili Prefecture in July 1954. The Kazakh autonomous prefecture of Ili had 3 prefectures of Altay, Ili and Tacheng under its administration when it was established in November 1954. The Ili Prefecture firstly ceased to be as a separate prefecture in December 1955, its county-level administrative units were directly administered by the autonomous prefecture of Ili. Since then, the Kazakh autonomous prefecture of Ili has existed as a separate administrative division. Its administrative divisions have either been reduced to the geographical scope of the former Ili Prefecture or expanded back to the territory of the former 3 prefectures. As a separate administrative unit, Ili Prefecture existed until its final dissolution in 2001.

History

Early history 

Before the advent of the Qin dynasty (221BC206BC), Ili was occupied by the Wusuns, a tributary tribe of the Huns. The Ussuns were driven away in the 6th century AD by the Northern Xiongnu, who established the First Turkic Khaganate in 552. Later this Khulja territory became a dependency of Dzungaria. During the Tang dynasty (618907), the khanate became the Protectorate General to Pacify the West of the Tang Empire.

The Uyghur Khaganate and in the 12th century the Kara-Khitai, took possession of the area in turn. Genghis Khan conquered Kulja in the 13th century and the Mongol Khans resided in the valley of the Ili. It is supposed that the Oirats conquered it at the end of the 16th or the beginning of the 17th century.

Qing dynasty 
The Oirats or more precisely Dzungars, controlled both Dzungaria and the Ili Basin until 1755 as the Dzungar Khanate, when it was annexed by the Manchu-run Qing dynasty under the Qianlong Emperor. Having defeated the Dzungars in the Dzungarian and Ili Basins, as well as the Afaqi Khojas in Kashgaria, the Qing court decided to make the Ili basin the main base of their control in Xinjiang.

In the 1760s, the Qing built nine fortified towns in the Ili Basin:

Huiyuan Cheng, as the seat of the General of Ili, the chief commander of the Qing troops in Xinjiang, became the administrative capital of the region. It was provided with a large penal establishment and a strong garrison. This city was called New Kulja, Manhcu Kulja, Chinese Kulja or Ili by the Russians and Westerners, to distinguish it from Nigyuan/Yining, known as Old Kulja or Taranchi Kulja.

The first General of Ili was Ming Rui. The Qing tradition, unbroken until the days of Zuo Zongtang in the 1870s, was to only appoint Manchus as officials in Xinjiang.

During the insurrection of 1864 the Dungans and Taranchis of the area formed the Taranchi Sultanate. Huiyuan (Manchu Kulja) was the last Qing fortress in the Ili Valley to fall to the rebels. The insurgent Dungans massacred most of Manchu Kulja's inhabitants; Governor General Mingsioi (Ming Xü) assembled his family and staff in his mansion and blew it up, dying under its ruins.

The insurrection led to the occupation of the Ili basin (Kulja in contemporary Western terms) by the Russians in 1871. Ten years later, part of the territory was restored to China and its boundary with Russia was assigned in accordance with the Treaty of Saint Petersburg (1881).

In October 1884, the Qing Government officially approved the foundation of Xinjiang Province. First of all, a major reform of General Ili system was made and the Amban and Baig systems were abolished and replaced by circuit, urban prefecture, prefecture and county systems. Although General Ili still existed, but its name was changed to "Ili Garrison General". its power and management scope greatly were reduced, no longer the military affairs in the entire territory of Xinjiang, only the military and defensive affairs in Ili and Tacheng, and the Ili Garrison General and Xinjiang Grand coordinator were separate directly under the Qing Government. As a subdivision of Xinjiang Province, Yita Circuit was formed in Ili and Tacheng in 1888, it was headquartered in Ningyuan County (present Yining). Yita Circuit was divided into Ili Prefecture (Yili Fu), Tacheng Direct-administered Division and Jinghe Direct-administered Division. Meanwhile, Ili Garrison General in charge of frontier defence and station troops, was headquartered in Huiyuan Town. Altay region was formed from Khovd (headquartered in Khovd Town) in 1904.

Modern times 
The Xinhai Revolution broke out in October 1911. Under the leadership of Yang Zuanxu, a general of Ili New Army, an armed rebellion against Qing Government broke out on January 7, 1912. The rebels occupied Huiyuan Town and killed Zhi Rui, the Ili Garrison General, whose predecessor Guang Fu served as the military governor of Ili provisional government. On February 12, 1912, the Provisional Government of the Republic of China was established in Beijing and on March 15, the Beijing government ordered Yuan Dahua of the Xinjiang Grand Coordinator to end the Qing dynasty's rule in Xinjiang. The conflict between the two sides was over, the position of military governor replaced grand coordinator. On April 25, Yuan Dahua was forced to announce his resignation from the grand coordinator of Xinjiang. On May 18, with shrewdness and actual strength, Yang Zengxin was recommended for the Military Governor of Xinjiang, meanwhile both sides continued peace negotiations. On July 8, the two sides signed a peace agreement, that the position of Garrison General of Ili was replaced by Defence Governor of Ili with the responsibilities and rights by the former garrison general of Ili. Guang Fu still served as the Defence Governor of Ili under the jurisdiction of Beijing central government. The two sides confirmed republican and democratic system, Yang Zengxin presided over the military and political affairs and recognized Yang Zengxin as the top military and political chief in the whole territory of Xinjiang. In August 1912, the Nationalist Government adjusted administrative divisions, the Defence Governor of Ili headquartered in Huiyuan Town, the Counsellor established from Tacheng and the Business Executive found in Altay were directly under the central government, as a division of local civil affairs, Yita Circuit was retained and under the administration of the Defence Governor of Ili.

The position of Ili Defence Governor was vacant after that Guang Fu died of illness on February 1, 1914. Yang Zengxin, the Military Governor of Xinjiang flew a petition to Beiyang government, finally Yang Feixia held the position of Ili Defence Governor, its administrative jurisdiction was changed to Xinjiang Province from the central government. Yita Circuit was divided into Ili and Tacheng two circuits, the circuit governor of Tacheng replaced the counsellor of Tacheng with the establishment of Tacheng Circuit in 1916. The Beiyang government assigned the Altay Chief to Xinjiang Province and Ashan Circuit of Xinjiang was established from the Altay region in 1919. With the decree for the abolition of minggans and centenarii and the establishment of district and township divisions issued in August 1939, Kazakh pastoral affairs was gradually integrated into Local government services.

Ili Prefecture was established in 1943, there were 11 counties and Xinyuan Division (present Xinyuan County), including Yining, Suiding (part of present Huocheng), Khorgas (present Huocheng), Gongliu, Tekes, Gongha (present Nilka), Ningxi (present Qapqal), Jinghe, Bole, Wenquan and Zhaosu Counties under its administration. In December 1953, the Ili Kazakh Autonomous Region was approved to set up, it was an administrative division at prefecture-level and under the jurisdiction of Xinjiang Province, the 3 prefectures of Ili, Tacheng and Altay were under its administration. The Mongol autonomous prefecture of Bortala was founded from Bole, Jinghe and Wenquan, 3 counties of Ili Prefecture in July 1954. Ili Kazakh Autonomous Region was renamed to Ili Kazakh Autonomous Prefecture on February 5, 1955.

Geography

The autonomous prefecture of Ili is located in the hinterland of Eurasia, the northwest of Xinjiang and north of Tianshan, between the north latitude of 40 degrees 14′16″ - 49 degrees 10′45″, the east longitude of 80 degrees 09′42″ - 91 degrees 01′45″. It covers a total area of 268,591 square kilometers, accounting for 16.18% of the total area of Xinjiang. The autonomous prefecture, which is bordered on the east by Mongolia, by Aksu Prefecture, Bayingolin Autonomous Prefecture, Changji Autonomous Prefecture, Ürümqi City and the provincial direct-administered county-level city of Shihezi to the south, by Bortala Autonomous Prefecture to the west, by the Republic of Kazakhstan to the northwest, by the Russian Federation to the north, the prefecture-level city of Karamay in the middle south, is located in the north west corner of China. Chongqing-Xinjiang-Europe Railway, G218, G217 National Highways and S316 Provincial Highway pass through its territory. With a boundary line of 2,019 kilometers, including Khorgas, Bakhty and Jeminay, there are 9 ports of entry at the national level. With the unique location advantage, Ili has been an important commercial hub and international channel of opening up to the west.

In the autonomous prefecture, there are four types of landforms, 83,632 square kilometres of mountains, 62,989 square kilometres of hills, 102,974 square kilometres of plains, 20,439 square kilometres of deserts. Three major mountain ranges of Altai, Dzungar and Tianshan with year-round ice and snow stand from north to south. Located in Burqin County, the highest Friendship Peak of the Altai Range is 4,374 meters high, the snow line is 3,000 - 3,200 meters high, the glacier area is 293.2 square kilometers and the glacier reserves are 16.4 billion cubic meters. The peaks of Dzungar Mountains are 3,500-3,700 meters high. The snow line of Tianshan Mountains is 3,600-4,400 meters high with a glacier area of 3,139 square kilometers and its glacier reserves of 118.5 billion cubic meters.

Administrative divisions

Ili Kazakh Autonomous Prefecture is administratively divided into three parts -- Altay Prefecture and Tacheng Prefecture, together with a direct-administered region that includes Yining City, 2 other county-level cities, 7 counties and 1 autonomous county. In the legal status itself, it is only a prefecture-level division, which is a special case in China's administrative divisions. It is not accurate to regard Ili Kazakh Autonomous Region as a sub-provincial division, which has no legal basis. This situation can only assume that, the autonomous prefecture enjoys partial authority in sub-provincial division. Its direct-administered region is exactly coterminous with the historical area that in the past was often called by Russians and Westerners as Kulja or Kuldja.

Ethnic groups
Ili is a multi-ethnic autonomous prefecture, there are 13 local ethnic groups: Kazakh, Han, Uyghur, Hui, Mongol, Xibe, Kyrgyz, Uzbek, Manchu, Tatar, Russ, Daur and Tajik peoples. As of the end of 2018, it had a population of 4,582,500; of which 2,745,500 were ethnic minorities, which accounted for 59.9% of its total population.

A 2015 report provided the following ethnic breakdown of the population: the Han people numbered at 1,934,571 (making up 41.2% of the population), the Kazakh population was 1,257,003 (26.8%), Uyghurs were 819,701 (17.45%), Hui at 433,045 (9.2%), Mongols were 75,597 (1.6%), Xibes were 34,457, 22,428 Kyrgyz, 8,298 Uzbeks, 8,298 Daurs, 5,394 Russians, 5,199 Manchus, 2,852 Tatars, 153 Tajiks and 91,749 'others'.

Tourism
 Major tourist attractions include Narati Grassland, Guozigou and Kanas Lake. In 2015 alone, Ili has seen over 25 million travellers and earned over 19 billion CNY (US$2.92 billion) tourism receipts.

Transport

Road and Railway
An extensive road network is being built across the prefecture for economic development. In 2015, 66 million passengers travelled on road.

The railway has extended to both the very north part of Altay City and the westmost city of Khorgas on the China-Kazakhstan border.

Border crossings
Ili Kazak's 8 functioning ports of entry are:

 With Kazakhstan
 Aqimbek of Altay Prefecture
 Bakhtu,  from Tacheng; another primary point or port
 Dulat, in Qapqal Xibe Autonomous County: under Ili
 Jeminay of Altay Prefecture; another primary point or port
 Khorgas, in Huocheng County; under Ili; a primary Chinese "national" border crossing point or port of entry
 Muzart, in Zhaosu County: directly controlled by Ili; another primary point or port
 With Mongolia
 Khiziltaw of Altay Prefecture
 Taskhin of Altay Prefecture to Khovd
 Dayan-Khunshanzyui of Altay Prefecture to Bayan-Ölgii. Only open during Summer.

Head

First Secretary 
 Zhao Tianjie

Governors 
 Fathan (Pätіhan) Dälelhanūly Sügіrbaev, November 1954 – June 1955
 Jağda Babylyqūly, June 1955 – February 1957 Acting Act, from May 1958
 Qūrmanälі Ospanūly, June 1958 – September 1963
 Erğali Äbіlqaiyrūly(), September 1963 – May 1969
 Zhong Liangshu, May 1969 – May 1970 (military government)
 Wang Zhenzhong, May 1970 – July 1975 (military government)
 Xie Gaozhong, July 1975 – September 1975 (military government)
 Jänäbil Smağūlūly, September 1975 – February 1978
 Qasymbek Seiіtjanūly, March 1979 – April 1983
 Dıar Qūrmaşūly, April 1983 – May 1988
 Ashat Kerimbay, May 1988 – May 1993
 Bekmūhammed Mūsaūly, April 1993 – March 1998
 Alpysbai Rahymūly , March 1998 – June 2001
 Nurlan Äbilmäjinulı, March 2002 – January 2003
 Qyzaijan Seiіlqojaūly, March 2003 – November 2007
 Mäuken Seiіtqamzaūly, November 2007 – January 2012
 Mänen Zeinelūly, February 2012 – January 2016
 Qūrmaş Syrjanūly, from February 2016
 Qadan Käbenuly2021.4

Notable persons
Sayragul Sauytbay
Ehmetjan Qasim
Shayilan Nuerdanbieke

See also
 Second East Turkestan Republic
 Treaty of Livadia
 Ili pika

References

Citations

Sources 

 Henry Lansdell, "Russian Central Asia: Including Kuldja, Bokhara, Khiva and Merv". Full text  available at Google Books; there is also a 2001 facsimile reprint of the 1885 edition, . (Chapters XIV-XVI describe Lansdell visit to the area in the early 1880s, soon after the Russian withdrawal).

External links 

 Official site 
 Official site  
 Subdivision info (in Simplified Chinese)
 A TALE OF TWO CITIES: NEW MUSEUMS FOR YINING AND URUMQI  "CHINA HERITAGE NEWSLETTER", China Heritage Project, The Australian National University. ISSN 1833-8461. No. 3, September 2005. (Talks about Ili Kazak Autonomous Prefecture Museum in Yining).

 
Altai Mountains
Prefecture-level divisions of Xinjiang
Autonomous prefectures of the People's Republic of China
Kazak autonomous counties
States and territories established in 1954
1954 establishments in China